"Driving in My Car" is a song by Madness. It was released as a stand-alone single on 24 July 1982 and spent eight weeks on the UK Singles Chart, peaking at number four. It reached number 20 on the Australian Singles Chart.

The B-side to the single was "Animal Farm", a mostly instrumental reworking of the song "Tomorrow's Dream" from the album 7. The 12" release of the single included the song "Riding on My Bike", which is basically a rewording of the main track, sung by Lee Thompson.

"Driving in My Car" was the 13th in a run of 20 consecutive UK top 20 hits for Madness, and is the only one of those 20 never to have been officially released on a Madness album in the USA. It was later included on the 2010 re-release of the band's 1982 album The Rise and Fall, as well as its two B-sides.

Video
The video shows Madness as car mechanics larking about in their workshop, and in their normal suits driving around in their "Maddiemobile" – a white 1959 model Morris Minor. The members of fellow ska/pop group Fun Boy Three make a brief appearance, trying (and failing) to hitch a ride to their home town of Coventry, which the A45 mentioned in the song passes through.

Track listing
7" single
"Driving in My Car" – 3:17
"Animal Farm (Tomorrow's Dream Warp Mix)" -4:02

12" single
"Driving in My Car" – 3:17
"Animal Farm (Tomorrow's Dream Warp Mix)" -4:02
"Riding on My Bike" – 4:35

Certifications and sales

Charts

References

1982 songs
1982 singles
Madness (band) songs
Stiff Records singles
Songs written by Mike Barson
Song recordings produced by Clive Langer
Song recordings produced by Alan Winstanley
Songs about cars